This list of land borders with date of establishment identifies the historical year in which borders were established between countries.

Europe

Albania–Greece
1913/1914 after Greek withdrawal due to international diplomatic pressure.

Albania–Montenegro
Shkodër - Berane
1913 at the Treaty of London ending the Balkan Wars.
From Shkodër - Podgorica to Shkodër - Ulcinj
1878 at the Treaty of Berlin, border between Montenegro and the Ottoman Empire.
1913 at the Treaty of London

Albania–North Macedonia
1913 at the Treaty of London, border between Albania and Serbia.
1991 Independence for the Republic of Macedonia.

Albania–Serbia
1913 at the Treaty of London.

Andorra–France
985 France doesn't help Barcelona versus the Saracens, border between France and Barcelona.
1278 Foix gains co-sovereignty over Andorra next to the bishop of Urgel.

Andorra–Spain
1278 Foix gains co-sovereignty over Andorra next to the Bishop of Urgel.
1479 Union between Castile and Aragon, the beginning of Spain.

Austria–Czech Republic
12th/13th century, region settled by Germans, border between Austria and Bohemia (Czech Republic).

Austria–Liechtenstein
1719 Creation of Liechtenstein.

Austria–Switzerland
Stuben - Scuol
1363 Tyrol becomes Austrian, border between Austria and the bishopric of Chur.
1497/1498 Grissons allies with Switzerland.
Schruns - Davos
1420 Austria acquires Montafon, border between Austria and Toggenburg.
1497/1498 Grissons allies with Switzerland.
Bregenz - St. Gallen
15th century, Austria becomes the dominant power on the east bank of the Rhine.
1491 Switzerland takes control of the west bank of the Rhine.

Austria–Slovakia
976 Babenberger receive the Eastmark from the Germanic king, border between Austria and Hungary.
1993 Slovakia gains independence from Czechoslovakia.

Austria–Hungary
1919 at the Treaty of Saint-Germain, one of the treaties ending World War I.

Austria–Slovenia
1919 at the Treaty of Saint-Germain, border between Austria and Yugoslavia.
1991 Slovenian independence.

Austria–Germany
1871 establishment of the German Empire, border between Austria-Hungary and Germany.

Austria–Italy
From Nauders - Mals to Lienz - Bruneck
1919 at the Treaty of Saint-Germain.
Kötschach - Paluzza
1st millennium, border between Italy and Carinthia.
1335 Carinthia is inherited by the duke of Austria, border between Austria and Aquileia.
1866 Venice conquered by Italy from Austria.
Villach - Tarvisio
1919 at the Treaty of Saint-Germain.

Azerbaijan–Georgia
1991 Azerbaijani and Georgian independence from the Soviet Union.

Azerbaijan–Russia
1991 dissolution of the Soviet Union.

Belarus–Latvia

1920 peace between Latvia/Poland and the Soviet Union, border between Latvia and the Soviet Union/Poland.
1991 Belarusian and Latvian independence.

Belarus–Poland
 1945 after the annexation of Belarusian-populated eastern Poland by the Soviet Union during World War II, border between Poland and the Soviet Union.
1991 Belarusian independence.

Belarus–Russia
From Polatsk - Velikiye Luki to Mahilyow - Klincy
1991 dissolution of the Soviet Union.
Gomel - Klincy
1667 at the Treaty of Andrusovo ending the Russo-Polish War, border between Russia and Poland–Lithuania.
1991 dissolution of the Soviet Union.

Belarus–Ukraine
1991 Belarusian and Ukrainian independence.

Belgium–Netherlands
From Knokke-Heist - Cadzand to Bree - Budel
1648 at the peace of Westphalia between the Netherlands and Spain ending the Thirty Years' War.
1830/1839 after the Belgian Revolution against the (united) Netherlands.
From Bree - Weert to Plombières - Vaals
1839 at the Treaty of London.

Belgium–France
From De Panne - Bray-Dunes to Poperinge - Godewaersvelde
1697 at the peace of Rijswijk, between France and Spain.
1830/1839 After the Belgian Revolution.
From Loker - Bailleul to Comines
1713 at the peace of Utrecht, between France and Austria
1830/1839 After the Belgian Revolution.
From Menen - Tourcoing to Mons - Maubeuge
1697 at the peace of Rijswijk, between France and Spain.
1830/1839 After the Belgian Revolution.
From Binche - Maubeuge to Chimay - Fourmies
1678/1679 at the peace of Nijmegen, between France and Spain.
1830/1839 After the Belgian Revolution.
Couvin - Rocroi
941? Border between France and Germany.
1830/1839 After the Belgian Revolution.
From Couvin - Revin to Agimont - Givet
1678/1679 at the peace of Nijmegen, between France and the bishopric of Liege.
1830/1839 After the Belgian Revolution.
From Hastière - Givet to Aubange - Longwy
1697 at the peace of Rijswijk, between France and Germany (Spain and the bishopric of Liege).
1830/1839 After the Belgian Revolution.

Belgium–Luxembourg
From Aubange - Pétange to Gouvy - Huldange
1839 at the Treaty of London.
Burg-Reuland - Leithum
1839 at the Treaty of London, between Luxembourg and Prussia.
1919 at the Treaty of Versailles.

Belgium–Germany
1919 at the Treaty of Versailles.

Bosnia and Herzegovina–Croatia
1995 Dayton Agreement ending the Bosnian War.

Bosnia and Herzegovina–Montenegro
Sarajevo - Pljevlja
1913 at the Treaty of London, border between Montenegro and Austria-Hungary.
1995 Dayton Agreement, border between Bosnia and Herzegovina and Yugoslavia.
2006 Montenegrin independence.
Sarajevo - Nikšić
1878 at the Treaty of Berlin, border between Montenegro and Austria-Hungary.
1995 Dayton Agreement, border between Bosnia and Herzegovina and Yugoslavia.
2006 Montenegrin independence.
Trebinje - Herceg Novi
1995 Dayton Agreement, border between Bosnia and Herzegovina and Yugoslavia.
2006 Montenegrin independence.

Bosnia and Herzegovina–Serbia
Zvornik - Loznica
13th century, after Serbian conquest, border between Serbia and Bosnia.
1995 Dayton Agreement, border between Bosnia and Herzegovina and Yugoslavia.
2006 Serbian self-determination.
Sarajevo - Priboj
1913 at the Treaty of London, border between Serbia and Austria-Hungary.
1995 Dayton Agreement, border between Bosnia and Herzegovina and Yugoslavia.
2006 Serbian self-determination.

Bulgaria–Greece
 Petrich - Sidirokastro
 1913 at the Treaty of London.
 From Smolyan - Xanthi to Svilengrad - Orestiada
 1919 at the Treaty of Neuilly.

Bulgaria–North Macedonia
Petric - Strumica
1919 at the Treaty of Neuilly, border between Bulgaria and Yugoslavia.
1991 Independence for the Republic of Macedonia.
Blagoevgrad - Kočani
1913 at the Treaty of Bucharest, border between Bulgaria and Serbia.
1991 Independence for the Republic of Macedonia.
Kyustendil - Skopje
1878 Bulgarian independence, border between Bulgaria and the Ottoman Empire.
1991 Independence for the Republic of Macedonia.

Bulgaria–Romania
Varna - Constanța
1878 after the defeat of the Ottoman Empire.
From Silistra - Fetești to Vidin - Calafat
1185 After Bulgarian uprise against the Byzantine Empire, border between Bulgaria and the Cumans.
1859 formation of Romania, border between Romania and the Ottoman Empire.
1878 Bulgarian independence.

Bulgaria–Serbia
Sofia - Pirot
1919 at the Treaty of Neuilly, border between Bulgaria and Yugoslavia.
2006 Serbian self-determination.
Vidin - Zaječar
1878 Bulgarian and Serbian independence.

Bulgaria–Turkey
Burgas - Kırklareli
1913 at the Treaty of London, border between Bulgaria and the Ottoman Empire (Turkey).
Elhovo - Edirne
1885 after the East Rumelian revolution, border between Bulgaria and the Ottoman Empire (Turkey).
Svilengrad - Edirne
1919 at the Treaty of Neuilly, border between Bulgaria and the Ottoman Empire (Turkey).

Croatia–Hungary
Osijek - Pécs
1920 at the Treaty of Trianon, border between Hungary and Yugoslavia.
1991 Croatian independence.
From Našice - Pécs to Varaždin - Nagykanizsa
10th century.

Croatia–Montenegro
1991 Croatian independence, border between Croatia and Yugoslavia.
2006 Montenegrin independence.

Croatia–Serbia
Osijek - Apatin
1995 Dayton agreement, border between Croatia and Yugoslavia.
2006 Serbian self-determination.
Vukovar - Bačka Palanka
925 Croatia conquers Slavonia, border between Croatia and Hungary.
2006 Serbian self-determination.
Vukovar - Sremska Mitrovica
1995 Dayton agreement, border between Croatia and Yugoslavia.
2006 Serbian self-determination.

Croatia–Slovenia
Čakovec - Murska Sobota
1991 Croatian and Slovenian independence.
From Varaždin - Ptuj to Rijeka - Postojna
10th century, border between Croatia and Germany.
1991 Croatian and Slovenian independence.
Pazin - Koper
1991 Croatian and Slovenian independence.

Czech Republic–Germany
From Volary - Neureichenau to Mariánské Lázně - Mähring
843 Treaty of Verdun dividing the Carolingian Empire, border between Germany and the Bohemians (Czechs).
Cheb - Marktredwitz
1266 Egerland (Cheb) becomes Bohemian (dispute whether Bohemia was German at that time).
From Kraslice - Klingenthal to Hrádek nad Nisou - Zittau
9th century, Bohemia established, border between Bohemia (Czechs) and the Sorbs.
10th century, Germans conquer Sorb territories.

Czech Republic–Poland
From Liberec - Gorlice to Trutnov - Wałbrzych
9th century, border between Bohemia (Czech Republic) and Great Moravia.
10th century, border between Bohemia (Czech Republic) and Poland.
1945 Stalin gives German Silesia to Poland, border between Poland and Czechoslovakia.
1993 Czechoslovakia dissolved.
Náchod - Kłodzko to Ostrava - Racibórz
1945 Stalin gives German Silesia to Poland, border between Poland and Czechoslovakia.
1993 Czechoslovakia dissolved.
Český Těšín - Cieszyn
1919 border between Czechoslovakia and Poland.
1993 Czechoslovakia dissolved.

Czech Republic–Slovakia
From Břeclav - Senica to Frýdek-Místek - Žilina
10th century, Bohemia acquires Moravia, border between Bohemia (Czech Republic) and Hungary.
1993 Czechoslovakia splits in two.
Český Těšín - Čadca
1298 Bohemia acquires Upper Silesia, border between Bohemia (Czech Republic) and Hungary.
1993 Czechoslovakia splits in two.

Denmark–Germany
1920 after referendum.

Denmark–Sweden
2000 Copenhagen - Malmö bridge and tunnel

Estonia–Latvia
1918 Latvian and Estonian independence from Russia.

Estonia–Russia
Narva - Ivangorod
1478 Russian conquest of Novgorod, border between Russia and the German Order.
1991 dissolution of the Soviet Union.
Võru - Pskov
1510 Russian conquest of Pskov, border between Russia and the German Order.
1991 dissolution of the Soviet Union.

Finland–Norway
1751 Treaty of Strömstad

Finland–Russia
Nellim - Nikel
1946 at the Treaty of Paris, border between Finland and the Soviet Union.
Kuusamo - Topozero
1917 Finnish independence.
Kotka - Vyborg
1946 at the Treaty of Paris, border between Finland and the Soviet Union.

Finland–Sweden
17 September 1809 - Treaty of Fredrikshamn ending the Finnish War, border between the Grand Duchy of Finland and Sweden.

France–Switzerland
Saint-Louis - Basel
1501 Basel becomes a member of the Swiss Confederation, border between the Habsburg territories and Switzerland.
1648 at the Treaty of Westphalia.
Wentzwiller - Oberwil 
1648 at the Treaty of Westphalia, border between France and the bishopric of Basel.
1815 at the Congress of Vienna ending the Napoleonic Wars.
Leymen - Hofstetten-Flüh
1515 Swiss Solothurn buys Rotberg from the Rotberg family, border between the Habsburg territories and Switzerland.
1648 at the Treaty of Westphalia.
Lutter - Cholholx
1648 at the Treaty of Westphalia, border between France and the bishopric of Basel.
1815 at the congress of Vienna.
Lutter - Kleinlützel
1527 Swiss Solothurn buys Kleinlützel from the monastery of Kleinlützel, border between the Habsburg territories and Switzerland.
1648 at the Treaty of Westphalia.
From Blochmont - Ederswiler to Delle - Buix
1648 at the Treaty of Westphalia, border between France and the bishopric of Basel.
1815 at the congress of Vienna.
Montbéliard–Porrentruy
1815 at the congress of Vienna.
From Vaufrey - Porrentruy to Pontarlier - Fleurier
1678/1679 at the Treaty of Nijmegen ending the Franco-Dutch War, border between France and Germany (bishopric of Basel and Neuchâtel).
1815 at the congress of Vienna.
From Les Fourgs - Sainte-Croix to Les Rousses - Saint-Cergue
1536 border between Switzerland and Burgundy.
1678/1679 at the Treaty of Nijmegen.
From Gex - Saint-Cergue to Gex - Geneva
1536 after Swiss expansion, border between Switzerland and Savoy.
1601 after French expansion.
1932 borders finally settled.
Annemasse - Geneva
1536 Geneva member of the Swiss Confederation, border between Switzerland and Savoy.
1860 Savoy ceded to France by Sardinia-Piemonte.
Douvain - Geneva
1569 Chablais returns to Savoy, border between Switzerland and Savoy.
1860 Savoy ceded to France by Sardinia-Piemonte.
From Thonon-les-Bains - Monthey to Chamonix-Mont-Blanc - Martigny
15th/16th century, after Swiss expansion, border between Switzerland and Savoy.
1860 Savoy ceded to France by Sardinia-Piemonte.

France–Italy

Chamonix-Mont-Blanc - Courmayeur
1860 Savoy ceded to France by Sardinia-Piemonte.
Bourg-Saint-Maurice - Susa
1st millennium, Border between Italy and Burgundy.
1860 Savoy ceded to France by Sardinia-Piemonte.
Briançon - Cesana Torinese
1st millennium, Border between Italy and Burgundy.
1349 France buys Dauphiné from the heir, border between France and Germany (Savoy and Saluzzo).
1860 after Italian unification.
Barcelonette - Demonte
1st millennium, Border between Italy and Burgundy.
1481, Provence inherited by the king of France, border between France and Germany (Savoy and Saluzzo).
1860 after Italian unification.
From Isola - Vinadio to Sospel - Camporosso
1860 Italian unification and Nice ceded to France.
Menton - Ventimiglia
1860 Italian unification, border between Italy and Mentone.
1861 Mentone annexed by France.

France–Monaco
1848/1861 Revolt in Monaco's hinterland, France annexes rebel territory.

France–Spain
From Banyuls-sur-Mer - Llanca to Bourg-Madame - Puigcerdà
1659 at the Treaty of the Pyrenees ending the Franco-Spanish War.
Saint-Girons - Rialp
985 France doesn't help its province Barcelona against the Saracens, border between France and Barcelona.
1479 Aragon and Castile are unified and become known as Spain.
From Bagnères-de-Luchon - Vielha to Cauterets - Sallent de Gállego
843 at the Treaty of Verdun, border between France and Aragon.
1479 Aragon and Castile are unified and become known as Spain.
Urdos - Canfranc
843 at the Treaty of Verdun, border between France and Aragon. (French possession of Béarn was disputed until 1620).
1479 Aragon and Castile are unified and become known as Spain.
Arette - Isaba
843 at the Treaty of Verdun, Border between France and Pamplona.
1512 Castile (Spain) annexes southern Navarra.
Saint-Étienne-de-Baïgorry - Baztan
1512 Castile (Spain) annexes southern Navarra, border between Castile (Spain) and Lower Navarre.
1620 France annexes Lower Navarre.
Cambo-les-Bains - Baztan
843 at the Treaty of Verdun, Border between France and Pamplona.
1512 Castile (Spain) annexes southern Navarra.
Hendaye - Irun
843 at the Treaty of Verdun, Border between France and Pamplona.
1479 Aragon and Castile are unified and become known as Spain.

France–Germany
17th century
1871, German unification, Prussia annexes Alsace-Lorraine in the Franco-Prussian War.
1919, the Treaty of Versailles returns Alsace-Lorraine to France.

France–Luxembourg
Esch-sur-Alzette - Villerupt
Middle Ages, between Luxembourg and Bar.
1659 at the Treaty of the Pyrenees, between France and Spain.
1839 at the Treaty of London.
Dudelange - Thionville
1659 at the Treaty of the Pyrenees, between France and Spain.
1839 at the Treaty of London.
Schengen - Sierck-les-Bains
Middle Ages, between Luxembourg and Lorraine.
1661 at the Treaty of Vincennes, between France and Spain.
1839 at the Treaty of London.

France–UK
Calais - Dover

Georgia–Russia
From Tbilisi - Makhachkala to Kutaisi - Vladikavkaz
1991 dissolution of the Soviet Union.
Kutaisi - Nalchik
1001, Georgia acquires Abkhazia, border between Georgia and Alania.
1557 Russia conquers Kabardino-Balkaria, border between Russia and the Ottoman Empire.
1991 dissolution of the Soviet Union.
Sukhumi - Cherkessk
1001, Georgia acquires Abkhazia, border between Georgia and Alania.
1991 dissolution of the Soviet Union.
Sukhumi - Sochi
15th century, border between Georgia and the Ubykhs.
1991 dissolution of the Soviet Union.

Germany–Luxembourg
1815 at the Treaty of Vienna, between the (united) Netherlands and Prussia (German Confederation).
1839 at the Treaty of London, between Luxembourg and Prussia (German Confederation).

Germany–Netherlands
From Aachen - Vaals to Kleve - Gennep
1815 at the Congress of Vienna, between the (united) Netherlands and Prussia (German Confederation).
From Kranenburg - Groesbeek to Bunde - Nieuweschans
1648 at the peace of Westphalia, between the Netherlands and the Holy Roman Empire of the German nation.

Germany–Poland
1945 Stalin gives Eastern Germany to Poland, border between Soviet occupied Germany and Poland set at the Oder–Neisse line.

Germany–Switzerland
Lörrach - Basel
1648 at the Treaty of Westphalia.
From Rheinfelden to Laufenburg
1806 at the German Mediatisation (Reichsdeputationshauptschluss), between the Confederation of the Rhine (Germany) and the Republic of Helvetia (Switzerland).
From Waldshut-Tiengen - Döttingen to the Bodensee
1648 at the Treaty of Westphalia.

Greece–North Macedonia
 1913 at the Treaty of London, border between Greece and Serbia.

Greece–Turkey
 1913 at the Treaty of London, border between Bulgaria and the Ottoman Empire (Turkey).
 1923 at the Treaty of Lausanne ending the Greco-Turkish War.

Hungary–Romania
1920 at the Treaty of Trianon.

Hungary–Slovakia
1920 at the Treaty of Trianon, border between Hungary and Czechoslovakia.

Hungary–Serbia
1920 at the Treaty of Trianon, border between Hungary and Yugoslavia.

Hungary–Slovenia
1920 at the Treaty of Trianon, border between Hungary and Yugoslavia.
1991 Slovenian independence.

Hungary–Ukraine
1920 at the Treaty of Trianon, border between Hungary and Czechoslovakia.

Ireland–UK
1921 Independence of Ireland.

Italy–San Marino
1st millennium/1631, border between San Marino and Papal States.
1860 Italian nationalists conquer the eastern Papal States.

Italy–Slovenia
Tarvisio - Kranjska Gora
1919 at the Treaty of Saint-Germain, border between Italy and Yugoslavia.
1991 Slovenian declaration of independence.
From Cave del Predil - Strmec na Predelu to Gorizia - Nova Gorica
1947 at the Treaty of Paris, border between Italy and Yugoslavia.
Trieste - Postojna
1954 Free state Trieste dissolved, border between Italy and Yugoslavia.

Italy–Switzerland
Aosta - Martigny
1477 Swiss ally Valais conquers Martigny, border between Switzerland and Savoy.
1860 Italian unification.
Valtournenche - Zermatt
1416 Valais allies with Switzerland, border between Switzerland and Savoy.
1860 Italian unification.
Domodossola - Brig
1st millennium, border between Italy and Burgundy.
1416 Valais allies with Switzerland, border between Switzerland and Milan.
1860 Italian unification.
From Domodossola - Locarno to Porlezza - Lugano
1512 after Swiss conquest of Milan, border between Switzerland and Milan.
1860 Italian unification.
From Madesimo - Splügen to Livigno - Zernez
1st millennium, border between Italy and the Frankish Empire.
1497/1498 Grissons allies with Switzerland, border between Switzerland and Milan.
1860 Italian unification.
Taufers im Münstertal - Müstair
1497/1498 Grissons allies with Switzerland, border between Switzerland and the Habsburg territories.
1919 at the Treaty of Saint-Germain.

Italy–Vatican City
1929 Lateran Treaty

Latvia–Lithuania
1236 Lithuanian state established, border between Lithuania and other Balts.
1918 Lithuanian and Latvian independence.

Lithuania–Belarus
1991 Belarusian and Lithuanian independence.

Lithuania–Poland
 1919 at the Treaty of Versailles.

Lithuania–Russia
Kybartai - Gusev
13th century, border between Lithuania and the Baltic Prussians.
1991 dissolution of the Soviet Union.
Tauragė - Sovetsk
1923 after Lithuanian annexation, border between Lithuania and Germany.
1991 dissolution of the Soviet Union.

Latvia–Russia
Rēzekne - Pskov
1510, Russian conquest of Pskov, border between Russia and the German Order.
1991 dissolution of the Soviet Union.
Rēzekne - Sebez
1920 peace between Latvia and the Soviet Union.
1991 dissolution of the Soviet Union.

Liechtenstein–Switzerland
Vaduz - Igis
1497/1498 Grissons allies with Switzerland, border between Switzerland and Brandis.
1719 Creation of Liechtenstein.
Vaduz - Mels
1436 Inhabitants of Sargans become citizens of Swiss Zürich, border between Switzerland and Brandis.
1719 Creation of Liechtenstein.
Vaduz - Buchs
1485 Swiss Luzern buys Werdenberg, border between Switzerland and Brandis.
1719 Creation of Liechtenstein.
Bendern - Salez
1458 Lords of Sax-Forstegg ally with Switzerland, border between Switzerland and Brandis.
1719 Creation of Liechtenstein.

Moldova–Romania
Bălți - Iași
1859 formation of Romania, border between Romania and Russia.
1991 Moldovan independence.
Cahul - Brăila
1878 after Russian annexation of Southern Bessarabia, border between Romania and Russia.
1991 Moldovan independence.

Moldova–Ukraine
1991 Moldovan and Ukrainian independence.

Montenegro–Serbia
1913 at the Treaty of London.

North Macedonia–Serbia
1991 Independence for the Republic of Macedonia, border between the Republic of Macedonia and Yugoslavia.

Norway–Russia
 1326 Novgorod Republic which later Became Russia 1826 borders fixed between Russia and Norway, border between Russia and Sweden-Norway.

Norway–Sweden
Against Bohuslän (from The Iddefjord to near a line between Halden - Ed)
1658 at the Treaty of Roskilde ending the Second Northern War, border between Sweden and Denmark-Norway.
From Halden - Ed to around Trysil - Särna
probably 10th and 11th centuries
From Trysil - Särna to around Gäddede
1645 at the Treaty of Brömsebro ending the Torstenson War, new border between Sweden and Denmark-Norway.
From Gäddede almost to Russia
16th century, the drainage divide line between the Atlantic and the Baltic was used as border between Sweden-Finland and Denmark-Norway.
Precisely defined, 1751 by a treaty, after which border cairns were erected.
1809, the part now belonging to Finland was ceded from Sweden to Russia and therefore was no longer part of the Norway–Sweden border.

Poland–Slovakia
10th/11th century, border between Poland and Hungary.

Poland–Russia
 1945 Stalin divides German East Prussia, border between Poland and the Soviet Union.

Poland–Ukraine
From Chełm - Kovel to Przemyśl - Sambir
1945 after the annexation of East Poland by Stalin, border between Poland and the Soviet Union.
1991 Ukrainian independence.
Kremenaros-Krzemieniec - Uzhok Pass
11th century, border between Poland and Hungary.
1991 Ukrainian independence.

Portugal–Spain
 From Faro - Huelva to Portalegre - Cáceres
 12th/13th century, conquered by Portugal, border between Portugal and León/Castile.
 1479 Union between Castile and Aragon, the beginning of Spain.
 From Guarda - Salamanca to Braga - Vigo
 1139 Portugal becomes independent from León-Castile, border between Portugal and León-Castile.
 1479 Union between Castile and Aragon, the beginning of Spain.
 1864 Treaty of Lisbon sets border.

Romania–Ukraine
Sighetu Marmației - Khust
1919 at the Treaty of Versailles, border between Romania and Czechoslovakia/Polish or Ukrainian East Galicia.
1991 Ukrainian independence.
Suceava - Chernivtsi
1940/1944 border between Romania and the Soviet Union.
1991 Ukrainian independence.
Brăila - Izmail
1878 Romanian annexation of Dobruja, border between Romania and Russia.
1991 Ukrainian independence.

Romania–Serbia
Drobeta-Turnu Severin - Negotin
1284 after Serbian conquest, border between Serbia and Hungary.
1859 formation of Romania, border between Romania and Ottoman Empire.
1878 Serbian independence.
Anina - Bor
1284 after Serbian conquest, border between Serbia and Hungary.
1920 at the Treaty of Trianon, border between Romania and Yugoslavia.
2006 Serbian self-determination.
Timișoara - Belgrade
1920 at the Treaty of Trianon, border between Romania and Yugoslavia.
2006 Serbian self-determination.

Russia–Ukraine
1991 dissolution of the Soviet Union.

Slovakia–Ukraine
1991 Ukrainian independence, border between Ukraine and Czechoslovakia.
1993 Slovakian independence.

Spain–UK
La Línea de la Concepción - Gibraltar
1713 at the Treaty of Utrecht ending the War of the Spanish Succession, border between Spain and Great Britain (United Kingdom).

Asia

Afghanistan–China
18th century

Afghanistan–Iran
1857 Great Britain establishes the border between Persia (Iran) and Afghanistan after the Iranian defeat during the Anglo-Persian War

Afghanistan–Pakistan
1919 Afghanistan becomes independent from the British Empire, border between Afghanistan and the British Empire
1947 Pakistan becomes independent from the United Kingdom

Afghanistan–Tajikistan
1885 After Russian conquest of Panjdeh, border between Afghanistan and Russia
1991 Tajikistani independence

Afghanistan–Turkmenistan
1885 After Russian conquest, border between Afghanistan and Russia
1991 Turkmenistani independence

Afghanistan–Uzbekistan
1885 After Russian conquest, border between Afghanistan and Russia
1991 Uzbekistani independence

Armenia–Azerbaijan
1991 Armenian and Azerbaijani independence.

Armenia–Georgia
1991 Armenian and Georgian independence.

Armenia–Turkey
1921 at the Treaty of Kars, border between Turkey and the Soviet Union.
1991 Armenian independence.

Azerbaijan–Iran
Lankaran - Ardabil
1828 at the Treaty of Turkmenchay, border between Russia and Persia (Iran).
1991 Azerbaijani independence.
Stepanakert - Tabriz
1813 at the Treaty of Gulistan ending the Russo-Persian War, border between Russia and Persia (Iran).
1991 Azerbaijani independence.
Nakhchivan - Tabriz
1828 at the Treaty of Turkmenchay, border between Russia and Persia (Iran).
1991 Azerbaijani independence.

Azerbaijan–Turkey
1921 at the Treaty of Kars, border between Turkey and the Soviet Union.
1991 Azerbaijani independence.

Bangladesh–Burma
Chittagong–Mandalay
1558 Burma conquers Manipur, border between Burma and Arakan
1971 Bangladesh becomes independent from Pakistan
Chittagong–Sittwe
1784 Burma conquers Arakan, border between Burma and Great Britain
1971 Bangladesh becomes independent from Pakistan

Bangladesh–India
1947 Indian independence from the United Kingdom, border between India and Pakistan
1971 Bangladesh becomes independent from Pakistan after the Bangladesh Liberation War.

Bhutan–India
1616 Bhutan becomes independent from Tibet, border between Bhutan and the Kamata Kingdom
1947 Indian independence

Bhutan–China
1616 Bhutan becomes independent from Tibet, border between Bhutan and Tibet
1724 China conquers Tibet from the Dzungars

Brunei–Malaysia
1963 Establishment of Malaysia, border between the British protectorate of Brunei and Malaysia
1984 End of the British protectorate

Burma–India
1826 Treaty of Yandabo, Border between Burma and the United Kingdom
1947 Indian independence, border between India and the United Kingdom
1948 Burmese independence

Burma–China
Myitkyina–Dsayul
11th century, Pagan establishes Burma, border between Burma and the Tibetans
1724 China conquers Tibet from the Dzungars
Myitkyina–Baoshan
109 BC, China conquers the Dian kingdom, border between China and the Mon people
11th century, Pagan establishes Burma, border between Burma and Dali
1555 Burma conquers Upper Burma
1769 Last Chinese invasion
From Lashio–Baoshan to Kengtung–Simao
109 BC, China conquers the Dian Kingdom, border between China and the Mon people
1557 Burma conquers the Shan States
1769 Last Chinese invasion

Burma–Thailand
Kengtung–Chang Mai
1557 Pagan (Burma) conquers the Shan states, border between Burma and Chiang Mai
1774 Thailand conquers Chiang Mai from Burma
Rangoon–Chang Mai
1530s or 1540s, Burma is established out of several small states, border between Burma and Chiang Mai
1774 Thailand conquers Chiang Mai from Burma
Tavoy–Bangkok
1057 Thaton is conquered by Pagan (Burma), border between Pagan (Burma) and the Khmer Empire
16th-18th century, Burma conquers the Mon kingdoms

Cambodia–Laos
1353 Lan Xang (Laos) becomes independent from the Khmer Empire (Cambodia)

Cambodia–Thailand
Phnom Penh–Udon Thani
1353 Lan Xang (Laos) becomes independent from the Khmer Empire (Cambodia), Border between the Khmer Empire and Lan Xang
15th or 16th century, Ayutthaya Kingdom (Thailand) conquers western Lan Xang
Phnom Penh–Bangkok
14th/15th century, Ayutthaya Kingdom (Thailand) conquers the western part of the Khmer Empire (Cambodia)

Cambodia–Vietnam
1953 Cambodia becomes independent from France, border between Cambodia and France
1975 North Vietnam and South Vietnam are re-unified

China–Laos
109 BC, China conquers the Dian Kingdom, border between China and the Mon people
1353 Establishment of the kingdom of Lan Xang, border between Lan Xang (Laos) and the Mongolian Empire
1381 Ming China conquers Yunnan from Yuan (Mongolian) loyalists

China–Pakistan
1963 Trans-Karakoram Treaty

China–India
Shahidulla Mazar–Leh
1984 After Indian offensive against Pakistan on Siachen Glacier at 5,000 meters above sea level, disputed
Gartog–Leh
1962 Disputed, cease fire
Gartog–Shimla
1724 China conquers Tibet from the Dzungars, border between China and the Mughal Empire
1947 Indian independence, border between India and Tibet
1951 Tibet cedes de facto sovereignty to the People's Republic of China
Khampa Dsong–Gangtok
1724 China conquers Tibet from the Dzungars, border between China and Sikkim
1947 Indian independence, border between India and Tibet
1951 Conquest of Tibet by China
Lhasa–Tinsukia
1947 Indian independence, border between India and Tibet
1951 Conquest of Tibet by China

China–Kazakhstan
1881 at the Treaty of Saint Petersburg, border between China and Russia.
1991 Kazakhstani independence.

China–Kyrgyzstan
1881 At the Treaty of Saint Petersburg, border between China and Russia
1991 Kyrgyzstani independence

China–Mongolia
1911 Mongolian independence.

China–Nepal
1724 China conquers Tibet from the Dzungars, border between China and the Nepalese kingdoms
1768 The king of Gorkha unites all Nepalese kingdoms into one

China–North Korea
1895/1910 after Japanese conquest, border between China and Japan.
1945/1948 North Korean independence.

China–Tajikistan
1757 China conquers Sinkiang, border between Bukhara and China
1991 Tajikistani independence

China–Russia
From Mudanjiang - Vladivostok to Mohe - Never
1858 at the Treaty of Aigun.
Manzouli - Krasnokamensk
1689 at the Treaty of Nerchinsk.
Altay - Gorno-Altaysk
1755, China acquires the Ili-basin, border between China and the Altays.
1758, Russia acquires part of the Altay territory.

China–Vietnam
Malipo–Hanoi
1st millennium BC?, border between Văn Lang (Vietnam) and the Dian Kingdom
938, Vietnam becomes independent from China
Nanning–Hanoi
1st millennium BC?, border of Văn Lang (Vietnam)
214 BC, China conquers Guangxi

East Timor–Indonesia
1949 Indonesia becomes independent from the Netherlands, border between Indonesia and Portugal
2002 East Timor becomes independent from Indonesia

Egypt–Israel
1841 The United Kingdom forces Egypt to retreat from the Levant, border between Egypt and the Ottoman Empire
1948 Israeli independence

Egypt–Palestine (Gaza)
1841 The United Kingdom forces Egypt to retreat from the Levant, border between Egypt and the Ottoman Empire
1988 Palestine declaration, Egyptian withdrawal from Gaza
1977 Egyptian recognition of Israel

Georgia–Turkey
1921 at the Treaty of Kars, border between Turkey and the Soviet Union.
1991 Georgian independence.

India–Nepal
Siliguri–Kathmandu
1923 The British Empire recognizes the independence of Nepal, border between Nepal and the British Empire
1947 Indian independence from the United Kingdom
Patna–Kathmandu
1768 The king of Gorkha unites all Nepalese kingdoms into one, border between Nepal and Great Britain
1947 Indian independence from the United Kingdom
Gorakhpur–Kathmandu
1768 The king of Gorkha unites all Nepalese kingdoms into one, border between Nepal and the Mughal Empire
1947 Indian independence from the United Kingdom
Delhi–Kathmandu
1923 The British Empire recognizes the independence of Nepal, border between Nepal and the British Empire
1947 Indian independence from the United Kingdom

India–Pakistan
Siachen Glacier
1984 After Indian offensive on a glacier at 5,000 meters above sea level
From Srinagar–Skardu to Ahmedabad–Karachi
1947 Partition of India into two Dominions India and Pakistan following the Indian independence act and cease fire line of the war between India and Pakistan on Kashmir.

Indonesia–Malaysia
1949 Indonesia becomes independent from the Netherlands, border between Indonesia and the United Kingdom
1963 Establishment of Malaysia

Iran–Iraq
16th century, border between Persia (Iran) and the Ottoman Empire
1932 Iraqi independence

Iran–Pakistan
1872 Border agreement between Persia (Iran) and the British Empire
1947 Pakistan becomes independent from the United Kingdom

Iran–Turkey
16th century, border between Persia (Iran) and the Ottoman Empire (Turkey).

Iran–Turkmenistan
1885 After Russian conquest of Merv, border between Iran and Russia
1991 Turkmenistani independence

Iraq–Jordan
1932 Iraqi independence, border between Iraq and the British League of Nations mandate of Palestine
1946 Jordanian independence

Iraq–Kuwait
1932 Iraqi independence, border between Iraq and the British protectorate of Kuwait
1961 Kuwaiti independence

Iraq–Saudi Arabia
Baghdad–Al-Jawf
1926 Unification of Nejd and Hijaz, border between Saudi Arabia and the British League of Nations mandate of Iraq
1932 Iraqi independence
Nasiriyah–Ar Riyad
1975/1991 The Saudi-Iraqi neutral zone is split in two parts

Iraq–Syria
1932 Iraqi independence, border between Iraq and the French League of Nations mandate of Syria
1944 Syrian independence

Iraq–Turkey
1923 at the Treaty of Lausanne, border between Turkey and the British League of Nations mandate of Iraq.
1932 Iraqi independence.

Israel–Syria
1944 Syrian independence, border between Syria and the British League of Nations mandate of Palestine
1948 Israeli independence

Israel-Palestine (West Bank, East Jerusalem)
1988 Palestine Declaration of Independence
1993 Oslo Accords between Israel and Palestine (PLO)
1948 Israel independence

Israel–Jordan
Hefa–Irbid
1047 BC, border between Israel and Aram Damascus
1946 Jordanian independence, border between Jordan and the British United Nations mandate of Palestine
1948 Israeli independence
From Beersheba–Ma'an to Eilat–Al-'Aqabah
1946 Jordanian independence, border between Jordan and the British United Nations mandate of Palestine
1948 Israeli independence

Jordan–Syria
1944 Syrian independence, border between Syria and the British League of Nations mandate of Palestine
1946 Jordanian independence

Jordan–Saudi Arabia
1926 Unification of Nejd and Hijaz, border between Saudi Arabia and the British League of Nations mandate of Palestine
1946 Independence of Jordan

Jordan-Palestine (West bank)
1988 Jordanian withdrawal from West Bank, Palestinian independence declaration
1946 Jordanian independence
1994 Jordanian recognition of Israel

Kazakhstan–Kyrgyzstan
1991 Kazakhstani and Kyrgyzstani independence.

Kazakhstan–Russia
1991 dissolution of the Soviet Union.

Kazakhstan–Turkmenistan
1991 Kazakhstani and Turkmenistani independence.

Kazakhstan–Uzbekistan
1991 Kazakhstani and Uzbekistani independence.

Kuwait–Saudi Arabia
Al-Kuwayt–Al-Hafar al-Batin
1926 Unification of Nejd and Hijaz, border between Saudi Arabia and the British protectorate of Kuwait
1961 Kuwaiti independence
Al-Kuwayt–Dammam
1970 The Saudi-Kuwaiti neutral zone is split in two parts

Kyrgyzstan–Tajikistan
1991 Kyrgyzstani and Tajikistani independence

Kyrgyzstan–Uzbekistan
1991 Kyrgyzstani and Uzbekistani independence

Laos–Burma
1353 Establishment of Lan Xang (Laos), border between Lan Xang and the Shan states
1557 Burma conquers the Shan States

Laos–Thailand
Luang Prabang–Chiang Mai
1353 Establishment of Lan Xang (Laos), border between Lan Xang (Laos) and Lanna
1774 Lanna is conquered by Thailand, border between Thailand and Luang Prabang
1954 Laos becomes independent from France
Vientiane–Nakhon Ratchasima
1893 France conquers Vientiane from Thailand, border between Thailand and France
1954 Laos becomes independent from France

Laos–Vietnam
Phong Saly–Lai Châu
1st millennium BC, border between Văn Lang (Vietnam) and the Mon people
1353 Establishment of Lan Xang (Laos)
Luang Prabang–Hanoi
938 Vietnamese independence from China, border between Vietnam and the Tai
1353 Establishment of Lan Xang (Laos)
Vientiane–Xa-doai
938 Vietnamese independence from China, border between Vietnam and the Khmer Empire
1353 Establishment of Lan Xang (Laos)
Chamrap–Ða Nang
1353 Establishment of Lan Xang (Laos), border between Lan Xang and Champa
1475 Vietnam conquers northern Champa

Lebanon–Syria
1941/1943 Lebanese independence, border between Lebanon and the French League of Nations mandate of Syria
1944 Syrian independence

Lebanon–Israel
1941/1943 Lebanese independence, border between Lebanon and the British League of Nations mandate of Palestine
1948 Israeli independence

Malaysia–Singapore
1965 Singapore becomes independent from Malaysia (land connection via causeways)

Malaysia–Thailand
1909 Treaty of Bangkok, border between Thailand and the British Empire
1963 Establishment of Malaysia

Mongolia–Russia
From Choibalsan - Krasnokamensk to Mörön - Tulun
1727 at the Treaty of Kyakhta, border between Russia and China.
1911 Mongolian independence.
From Mörön - Kyzyl to Ulaangom - Kyzyl
1912/1944 Russia annexes Tuva.
Ölgij - Gorno-Altaysk
1758, Russia acquires part of the Altay territory, border between China and Russia.
1911 Mongolian independence.

North Korea–South Korea
 1953 after ceasefire.

North Korea–Russia
1858 at the Treaty of Aigun, border between Russia and China.
1948 Creation of North Korea, border between North Korea and the Soviet Union.
1991 Russian self-determination.

Oman–Saudi Arabia
1990 Border agreement

Oman–United Arab Emirates
Khasab–Dubai
1971 The United Arab Emirates and Oman become independent from the United Kingdom
Shinas–Dubai
1971 The United Arab Emirates and Oman become independent from the United Kingdom
Al Buraymi–Abu Zabi
1971 The United Arab Emirates and Oman become independent from the United Kingdom
1999 Border dispute on Al-Buraymi resolved

Oman–Yemen
1971 Omani independence, border between Oman and South Yemen
1990 North Yemen and South Yemen are unified
1992 Border dispute between Oman and Yemen settled about Habarut

Saudi Arabia–Qatar
2009 Signed at the UN headquarters

Saudi Arabia–United Arab Emirates
1974 Treaty of Jeddah, disputed

Saudi Arabia–Yemen
Ar Riyad–Mukalla
1926 Unification of Nejd and Hijaz, border between Saudi Arabia and the British protectorate of Aden
1990 Unification of South Yemen and North Yemen
Jizan–San'a
1934 Treaty of Taif, border between Saudi Arabia and (North) Yemen

Syria–Turkey
From Nusaybin - Cizre to Aleppo - Gaziantep
1923 at the Treaty of Lausanne, border between Turkey and the French League of Nations mandate of Syria.
1944 Syrian independence.
Aleppo - Antakya
1939 after referendum, border between Turkey and the French League of Nations mandate of Syria.
1944 Syrian independence.

Tajikistan–Uzbekistan
1991 Tajikistani and Uzbekistani independence

Turkmenistan–Uzbekistan
1991 Turkmenistani and Uzbekistani independence

Oceania

Indonesia–Papua New Guinea
1969 The Netherlands cedes Papua to Indonesia, border between Indonesia and Australia
1975 Papua New Guinea becomes independent from Australia

Africa

Algeria–Libya
1951 Libya becomes independent, border between Libya and France
1962 Algeria becomes independent

Algeria–Mali
1960 Mali becomes independent, border between Mali and France
1962 Algeria becomes independent

Algeria–Mauritania
1960 Mauritania becomes independent, border between Mauritania and France
1962 Algeria becomes independent

Algeria–Morocco
Tlemcen–Oujda
1554 Morocco is established after a merger of small states, border between Morocco and the Ottoman Empire
1710 Algiers (Algeria) becomes independent
Béchar–Casablanca
1844 Border between France and Morocco established after a war
1962 Algerian independence, border is disputed

Algeria–Niger
1960 Niger becomes independent, border between Niger and France
1962 Algeria becomes independent

Algeria–Tunisia
1956 Tunisia becomes independent, border between Tunisia and France
1962 Algeria becomes independent

Angola–Democratic Republic of the Congo
1960 Congolese independence, border between Congo-Léopoldville (DRC) and Portugal
1975 Angola becomes independent

Angola–Namibia
1975 Angola becomes independent, border between Angola and South Africa
1990 Namibia becomes independent

Angola–Republic of the Congo
1960 Congolese independence, border between Congo-Brazzaville (RC) and Portugal
1975 Angola becomes independent

Angola–Zambia
1964 Zambia becomes independent, border between Zambia and Portugal
1975 Angola becomes independent

Benin–Burkina Faso
1960 Independence for Benin and Burkina Faso

Benin–Niger
1960 Independence for Benin and Niger

Benin–Nigeria
1960 Independence for Benin and Nigeria

Burkina Faso–Togo
1960 Independence for Burkina Faso and Togo

Burkina Faso–Ghana
1957 Ghana becomes independent, border between Ghana and France
1960 Togo becomes independent

Burkina Faso–Côte d'Ivoire
1960 Independence for Burkina Faso and Côte d'Ivoire

Burkina Faso–Mali
1960 Independence for Burkina Faso and Mali

Burkina Faso–Niger
1960 Independence for Burkina Faso and Niger

Botswana–South Africa
1931 South Africa becomes independent, border between South Africa and the United Kingdom
1966 Botswana becomes independent

Botswana–Zimbabwe
1966 Botswana becomes independent, border between Botswana and Rhodesia
1980 Zimbabwe becomes independent

Botswana–Namibia
1966 Botswana becomes independent, border between Botswana and South Africa
1990 Namibia becomes independent

Burundi–Democratic Republic of the Congo
16th century, Establishment of Burundi, border of Burundi
1960 Congolese independence, border between Congo-Léopoldville (DRC) and Belgium
1962 Burundi becomes independent

Burundi–Rwanda
2nd Millennium, Establishment of Burundi and Rwanda
1962 Burundi and Rwanda become independent from Belgium

Burundi–Tanzania
16th century, Establishment of Burundi, border of Burundi
1962 Burundi becomes independent, border between Burundi and Tanganyika
1964 Establishment of Tanzania after a merger between Tanganyika and Zanzibar

Cameroon–Central African Republic
1960 Independence for Cameroon and the Central African Republic

Cameroon–Republic of the Congo
1960 Independence for Cameroon and Congo-Brazzaville (RC)

Central African Republic–Republic of the Congo
1960 Central African and Congolese independence

Central African Republic–Democratic Republic of the Congo
1960 Central African and Congolese independence

Central African Republic–Chad
1960 Independence for the Central African Republic and Chad

Cameroon–Gabon
1960 Independence for Cameroon and Gabon

Cameroon–Equatorial Guinea
1960 Cameroon becomes independent, border between Cameroon and Spain
1968 Equatorial Guinea becomes independent

Cameroon–Chad
1960 Independence for Cameroon and Chad

Cameroon–Nigeria
Garoua–Maiduguri
1960 Cameroon becomes independent, border between Cameroon and the British United Nations mandate of Cameroons
1961 Northern Cameroons votes to become part of Nigeria
Bamenda–Yola
1961 After a referendum it is decided that Northern Cameroons becomes part of Nigeria and Southern Cameroons part of Cameroon
Douala–Calabar
1960 Nigerian independence, border between Nigeria and the British United Nations mandate of Cameroons
1961 Southern Cameroons votes to become part of Cameroon

Chad–Libya
1951 Libya becomes independent, border between Libya and France
1960 Chad becomes independent

Chad–Niger
1960 Independence for Chad and Niger

Chad–Nigeria
1980s, Lake Chad nearly dried up, border of Chad and Nigeria becomes a land border

Central African Republic–Sudan
1956 Sudanese independence from the United Kingdom and Egypt, border between Sudan and France
1960 The Central African Republic becomes independent

Chad–Sudan
1956 Sudanese independence from the United Kingdom and Egypt, border between Sudan and France
1960 Chad becomes independent

Côte d'Ivoire–Mali
1960 Independence for Côte d'Ivoire and Mali

Côte d'Ivoire–Guinea
1958 Guinea becomes independent, border between Guinea and France
1960 Côte d'Ivoire becomes independent

Côte d'Ivoire–Liberia
San Pédro–Harper
1857 The Republic of Maryland joins Liberia, border of Liberia
1960 Côte d'Ivoire becomes independent
Man–Zwedru
1892 Border agreement between Liberia and France
1960 Côte d'Ivoire becomes independent

Democratic Republic of the Congo–Sudan
1956 Sudanese independence from the United Kingdom and Egypt, border between Sudan and Belgium
1960 Congolese independence

Democratic Republic of the Congo–Republic of the Congo
1960 Independence for both Congo's, both named Republic of the Congo at the time

Democratic Republic of the Congo–Rwanda
2nd Millennium, Establishment of Rwanda, border of Rwanda
1960 Congolese independence, border between Congo-Léopoldville (DRC) and Belgium
1962 Rwanda becomes independent

Democratic Republic of the Congo–Uganda
1960 Congolese independence, border between Congo-Léopoldville (DRC) and the United Kingdom
1962 Uganda becomes independent

Democratic Republic of the Congo–Zambia
1960 Congolese independence, border between Congo-Léopoldville (DRC) and the United Kingdom
1964 Zambia becomes independent

Djibouti–Eritrea
1977 Djibouti becomes independent, border between Djibouti and Ethiopia
1991 Eritrean independence

Djibouti–Ethiopia
1897 Border established between Abyssinia (Ethiopia) and France
1977 Djibouti becomes independent

Djibouti–Somalia
1960 Somalian independence, border between Somalia and France
1977 Djibouti becomes independent

Egypt–Libya
1922 Egyptian independence, border between Egypt and Italy (Italian Libya)
1951 Libyan independence

Egypt–Sudan
1956 Sudanese independence from the United Kingdom and Egypt

Equatorial Guinea–Gabon
1960 Gabon becomes independent, border between Gabon and Spain
1968 Equatorial Guinea becomes independent

Eritrea–Sudan
1956 Sudanese independence from the United Kingdom and Egypt, border between Sudan and Ethiopia
1991 Eritrean independence

Eritrea–Ethiopia
1900/1902/1908 Border established between Abyssinia (Ethiopia) and Italy
1991 Eritrean independence after the Ethiopian Civil War

Ethiopia–Kenya
1907 Border agreement between Abyssinia (Ethiopia) and the British Empire
1963 Kenya becomes independent

Ethiopia–Sudan
1902 Border between Abyssinia (Ethiopia) and the United Kingdom established
1956 Sudanese independence from the United Kingdom and Egypt, border between Sudan and Ethiopia

Ethiopia–Somalia
Harar–Hargeysa
1897 Anglo-Egyptian Treaty, border between Abyssinia (Ethiopia) and the British Empire
1960 Somalian independence
Adis Abeba–Muqdisho
1897 Border agreement between Abyssinia (Ethiopia) and Italy
1960 Somalian independence

Gabon–Republic of the Congo
1960 Independence for Gabon and Congo-Brazzaville (RC)

The Gambia–Senegal
1960 Senegal becomes independent, border between Senegal and the United Kingdom
1965 The Gambia becomes independent

Ghana–Togo
1957 Ghana becomes independent, border between Ghana and the French United Nations mandate of Togoland
1960 Togo becomes independent

Ghana–Côte d'Ivoire
1957 Ghana becomes independent, border between Ghana and France
1960 Côte d'Ivoire becomes independent

Guinea–Liberia
1892 Border agreement between Liberia and France
1958 Guinea becomes independent

Guinea–Sierra Leone
1958 Guinea becomes independent, border between Guinea and the United Kingdom
1961 Sierra Leone becomes independent

Guinea–Mali
1958 Guinea becomes independent, border between Guinea and France
1960 Mali becomes independent

Guinea–Senegal
1958 Guinea becomes independent, border between Guinea and France
1960 Senegal becomes independent

Guinea–Guinea-Bissau
1958 Guinea becomes independent, border between Guinea and Portugal
1973/1974 Guinea-Bissau becomes independent

Guinea–Bissau-Senegal
1960 Senegal becomes independent, border between Senegal and Portugal
1973/1974 Guinea-Bissau becomes independent

Kenya–Sudan
1956 Sudanese independence from the United Kingdom and Egypt, border between Sudan and the United Kingdom
1963 Kenya becomes independent

Kenya–Somalia
1960 Somalian independence, border between Somalia and the United Kingdom
1963 Kenya becomes independent

Kenya–Uganda
1962 Uganda becomes independent, border between Uganda and the United Kingdom
1963 Kenya becomes independent

Kenya–Tanzania
1963 Kenya becomes independent, border between Kenya and Tanganyika
1964 Establishment of Tanzania after a merger between Tanganyika and Zanzibar

Lesotho–South Africa
Maseru–Pietermaritzburg
1822 Establishment of Basutoland (Lesotho), border between Basutoland and the Zulu Kingdom
1931 South Africa becomes independent, border between South Africa and the United Kingdom
1966 Lesotho becomes independent. 
Maseru–East London
1822 Establishment of Basutoland (Lesotho), border between Basutoland and the Xhosa
1931 South Africa becomes independent, border between South Africa and the United Kingdom
1966 Lesotho becomes independent
Maseru–Bloemfontein
1931 South Africa becomes independent, border between South Africa and the United Kingdom
1966 Lesotho becomes independent

Libya–Niger
1951 Libyan independence, border between Libya and France
1960 Niger becomes independent

Libya–Sudan
1951 Libyan independence, border between Libya and the United Kingdom
1956 Sudanese independence from the United Kingdom and Egypt

Libya–Tunisia
1951 Libya becomes independent, border between Libya and France
1956 Tunisia becomes independent

Liberia–Sierra Leone
Robertsport–Freetown
1847 Liberia becomes independent from the United States, border of Liberia
1961 Sierra Leone becomes independent
Voinjama–Koidu
1885 Border agreement between Liberia and the British Empire
1961 Sierra Leone becomes independent

Mali–Senegal
1960 Independence for Mali and Senegal

Mali–Mauritania
1960 Independence for Mali and Mauritania

Malawi–Mozambique
1964 Malawi becomes independent, border between Malawi and Portugal

Mali–Niger
1960 Independence for Mali and Niger

Malawi–Tanzania
1964 Establishment of Tanzania after a merger between Tanganyika and Zanzibar and the independence of Malawi

Malawi–Zambia
1964 Malawi and Zambia becomes independent

Mauritania–Senegal
1960 Independence for Mauritania and Senegal

Morocco–Spain
Nador - Melilla
1894 borders between Morocco and Melilla were fixed.
Tanger - Ceuta
17th century.

Mozambique–South Africa
1931 South Africa becomes independent, border between South Africa and Portugal
1975 Mozambique becomes independent from the Portuguese Empire.

Mozambique–Swaziland
1830s, Swaziland is moved up north in order to reduce the pressure from the Zulus, border between Swaziland and Portugal
1975 Mozambique becomes independent

Mozambique–Tanzania
1964 Establishment of Tanzania after a merger between Tanganyika and Zanzibar, border between Tanzania and Portugal
Mozambique becomes independent

Mozambique–Zambia
1964 Zambia becomes independent, border between Zambia and Portugal
1975 Mozambique becomes independent

Mozambique–Zimbabwe
1975 Mozambique becomes independent, border between Mozambique and Rhodesia
1980 Zimbabwe becomes independent

Namibia–Zambia
1964 Zambia becomes independent, border between Zambia and South Africa
1990 Namibia becomes independent

Namibia–South Africa
1990 Namibia becomes independent from South Africa

Niger–Nigeria
1960 Independence for Niger and Nigeria

Rwanda–Tanzania
2nd Millennium, Establishment of Rwanda, border of Rwanda
1962 Rwanda becomes independent, border between Rwanda and Tanganyika
1964 Establishment of Tanzania after a merger between Tanganyika and Zanzibar

Rwanda–Uganda
2nd Millennium, Establishment of Rwanda, border of Rwanda
1962 Independence of Rwanda and Uganda

Sudan–Uganda
1956 Sudanese independence from the United Kingdom and Egypt, border between Sudan and the United Kingdom
1962 Uganda becomes independent

South Africa–Eswatini
1830s, Swaziland is moved up north in order to reduce the pressure from the Zulus, border of Swaziland
1931 South Africa becomes independent, border between South Africa and the United Kingdom
1968 Swaziland becomes independent

South Africa–Zimbabwe
1931 South Africa becomes independent, border between South Africa and the United Kingdom
1980 Zimbabwe becomes independent

Tanzania–Uganda
1962 Uganda becomes independent, border between Uganda and Tanganyika
1964 Establishment of Tanzania after a merger between Tanganyika and Zanzibar

Tanzania–Zambia
1964 Establishment of Tanzania after a merger between Tanganyika and Zanzibar and the independence of Zambia

Zambia–Zimbabwe
1964 Zambia becomes independent, border between Zambia and the United Kingdom
1980 Zimbabwe becomes independent

North America

Belize–Guatemala
1840 Guatemala becomes independent from Central America, border between Guatemala and the United Kingdom
1981 Belize becomes independent

Belize–Mexico
1821 Mexico becomes independent from the Spanish Empire, border between Mexico and the United Kingdom
1981 Belize becomes independent

Canada–United States
Saint John–Bangor
1783 At the Treaty of Paris ending the American Revolutionary War, border between the United States and Great Britain
Edmundston–Presque Isle
1842 At the Webster–Ashburton Treaty ending the Aroostook War, border between the United States and the United Kingdom
From Montréal–Boston to Thunder Bay–Minneapolis
1783 At the Treaty of Paris, border between the United States and Great Britain
From Winnipeg–Grand Forks to Calgary–Great Falls
1818 At the Treaty of 1818, border between the United States and the United Kingdom
Vancouver–Seattle
1846 At the Oregon Treaty, border between the United States and the United Kingdom
Whitehorse–Juneau
1903 At the Hay–Herbert Treaty, border between the United States and the British Empire
From Whitehorse–Anchorage to Inuvik–Prudhoe Bay
1867 Alaska Purchase, border between the United States and the United Kingdom

Costa Rica–Panama
1838 Costa Rica becomes independent, border between Colombia and Costa Rica
1903 Panama becomes independent

Costa Rica–Nicaragua
1838 Costa Rica and Nicaragua become independent

Dominican Republic–Haiti
1804 Haiti becomes independent from the French Empire, border between Haiti and France
1821/1844 The Dominican Republic becomes independent from Haiti

El Salvador–Guatemala
1840 El Salvador and Guatemala become independent

El Salvador–Honduras
1839 Honduras becomes independent from the Federal Republic of Central America, border between Honduras and the Federal Republic of Central America
1840 El Salvador established after the dissolution of the Federal Republic of Central America

France–Netherlands
1648 France and the Netherlands divide Saint Martin.

Guatemala–Honduras
1839 Honduras becomes independent from the Federal Republic of Central America, border between Honduras and the Federal Republic of Central America

Guatemala–Mexico
1821 Mexico becomes independent, border between Mexico and the Federal Republic of Central America
1840 Guatemala becomes independent

Honduras–Nicaragua
1838 Nicaragua becomes independent from the Federal Republic of Central America, border between Nicaragua and the Federal Republic of Central America
1839 Honduras becomes independent

Mexico–United States
From Matamoros–Corpus Christi to Juárez–El Paso
1848 At the Treaty of Guadalupe Hidalgo ending the Mexican-American War.
Hermosillo–Phoenix
1853 Gadsden Purchase
Tijuana–San Diego
1848 At the Treaty of Guadalupe Hidalgo

South America

Argentina–Brazil
Puerto Iguazú–Foz do Iguaçu
1814 Misiones is claimed by Argentina, border between Argentina and Portugal
Posadas–Pato Branco
1927 Border between Argentina and Brazil is settled
Posadas–Porto Alegre
1814 Misiones is claimed by Argentina, border between Argentina and Portugal
Corrientes–Santa Maria
1820 After the division of the territory of the Liga Federal, border between the United Provinces of South America (Argentina) and Portugal

Argentina–Bolivia
1825 Bolivian independence from the United Provinces of South America
1925 Final border Treaty

Argentina–Chile
Salta–Antofagasta
1884 Chile conquers the Bolivian Antofagasta Region
1899 Border settled
Mendoza–Santiago de Chile
1810 The United Provinces of South America (Argentina) becomes independent, border between Argentina and Spain
1818 Chile becomes independent with help from Argentina
From Comodoro Rivadavia–Coihaique to Ushuaia–Punta Arenas
1881 Boundary Treaty of 1881 between Chile and Argentina

Argentina–Paraguay
1870 Border established after the Paraguayan War

Argentina–Uruguay
1820 Liga Federal is dissolved and the United Provinces of South America annexes the western provinces, creating today's border
1821 The remainder of Liga Federal is annexed by the United Kingdom of Portugal, Brazil and the Algarves
1825 Uruguay declares independence
1828 Uruguayan independence is recognized

Bolivia–Brazil
La Paz–Rio Branco
1903 Treaty of Petropolis, Bolivia cedes Acre to Brazil
Riberalta–Bom Comérico
1867 Bolivia cells northern Acre to Brazil
La Paz–Porto Velho
1822 Brazilian independence, border between Brazil and Spain
1825 Bolivian independence
Santa Cruz–Cuiabá
1867 Bolivia cells parts of eastern Bolivia to Brazil
1927 Final border Treaty

Bolivia–Chile
Julaca–Antofagasta
1884 Chile conquers the Bolivian Antofagasta Region
La Paz–Arica
1825 Bolivian independence, border between Bolivia and Peru
1880 Arica is conquered by Chile

Bolivia–Paraguay
1938 Chaco War ends with a truce, the current border created
2009 A final Treaty is signed to clearly mark the border

Bolivia–Peru
La Paz–Arequipa
1824 Spanish defeated in Peru, border between Peru and Spain
1825 Bolivian independence
Riberalta–Cuzco
1909 Border settled

Brazil–Colombia
1907 Treaty of Bogotá, Brazil and Colombia agree on most of the border
1928 The Tratado de Límites y Navegación Fluvial is signed, settling the border

Brazil–France
1713 The Treaty of Utrecht creates a border between France and Portugal.
1822 Brazil obtains independence

Brazil–Guyana
Santarém–Georgetown
1822 Brazilian independence, border between Brazil and the United Kingdom
1966 Guyana becomes independent
Boa Vista–Georgetown
1904 Italy arbiters in a border dispute, border between Brazil and the British Empire
1966 Guyana becomes independent
Boa Vista–Imbaimadai
1822 Brazilian independence, border between Brazil and the United Kingdom
1966 Guyana becomes independent

Brazil–Paraguay
Campo Grande–Forte Olimpo
1870 Paraguay is defeated in the Paraguayan War and loses territory to Brazil, border between Brazil and the disputed Chaco area, claimed by both Bolivia and Paraguay
1935 After the Chaco War
Campo Grande–Asunción
1870 Paraguay is defeated in the Paraguayan War and loses territory to Brazil
Cascavel–Asunción
1811 Paraguay becomes independent, border between Paraguay and Portugal
1822 Brazilian independence

Brazil–Peru
Eirunepé–Iquitos
1851 Border agreement
Rio Branco–Lima
1909 Border agreement

Brazil–Suriname
1906 Border between Brazil and the Netherlands defined in the Treaty of Limits
1975 Suriname obtains independence

Brazil–Uruguay
1825 Uruguay declares independence
1828 Uruguay's independence is accepted by Brazil

Brazil–Venezuela
1777 First Treaty of San Ildefonso is signed designating the border between Spain and Portugal
1819 Gran Colombia becomes independent
1822 Brazilian becomes independent
1830 Venezuela becomes independent

Colombia–Ecuador
1830 Ecuador becomes independent from Colombia
1916 Final border Treaty

Colombia–Panama
1903 Panama becomes independent from Colombia

Colombia–Peru
1922 Border agreement between Colombia and Peru, territory disputed with Ecuador
1942 Ecuador loses a war versus Peru

Colombia–Venezuela
1830 Venezuela becomes independent from Colombia

Ecuador–Peru
Quito–Iquitos
1942 After the Ecuadorian–Peruvian War, disputed
Cuenca–Sullana
1830 Ecuador becomes independent, disputed

France–Suriname
17th century, border between France and the Netherlands.
1975 Surinamese independence.

Guyana–Suriname
Georgetown–Paramaribo
1966 Guyana becomes independent, border between Guyana and the Netherlands
1975 Suriname becomes independent
Joli–Majoli
1966 Guyana becomes independent, border between Guyana and the Netherlands
1975 Suriname becomes independent, disputed

Guyana–Venezuela
1899 Border settled between Venezuela and the British Empire
1966 Guyana becomes independent, border disputed

Borders of Territories with special status

Hong Kong–China
 Boundary Street
1860 China under the Qing Dynasty ceded Kowloon Peninsula to the British crown colony of Hong Kong
 Sham Chun River, Sha Tau Kok River and Pak Kung Au
 1898 China under Ch'ing Dynasty leased the New Territories to the United Kingdom until 1997, and was added to the crown colony of Hong Kong
 Dongjiaotou 
 2007 The Central People's Government of the People's Republic of China leased an area in Dongjiaotou for Hong Kong, one of PRC's special administrative regions, to establish a boundary checkpoint across the Deep Bay / Shenzhen Bay.

Algeria–Western Sahara
1962 Algeria becomes independent, border between Algeria and Spain
1975 Western Sahara becomes independent and is mostly occupied by Morocco

Mauritania–Western Sahara
1960 Mauritania becomes independent, border between Mauritania and Spain
1975 Western Sahara becomes independent and is mostly occupied by Morocco

Morocco–Western Sahara
1884 Berlin Conference, Spain gains Western Sahara and subsequently occupies the territory, border between Morocco and Spain

Egypt–Palestinian Territories
1841 The United Kingdom forces Egypt to retreat from the Levant, border between Egypt and the Ottoman Empire
2005 Israel evacuates the Gaza Strip

Israel–Palestinian Territories
From Nazareth–Jenin to Beersheba–Hebron
1948 Cease fire line in First Arab-Israeli War, border between Israel and Jordan
Beersheba–Gaza
1948 Cease fire line in the war between Israel and the Arabs, border between Israel and Egypt
2005 Israel evacuates the Gaza Strip

Jordan–Palestinian Territories
1967 Israel conquers the West Bank, border between Jordan and Israel

References

Dates of establishment